Mark Palmer may refer to:

Mark Palmer (cricketer) (born 1967), Australian cricketer
Mark Palmer (diplomat) (1941–2013), American diplomat
Sir Mark Palmer, 5th Baronet (born 1941), British aristocrat